The Enbridge Pipeline System is an oil pipeline system which transports crude oil and dilbit from Canada to the United States. The system exceeds  in length including multiple paths. Main parts of the system are  Canadian Mainline and  Lakehead System (U.S. Mainline). On average, it delivers  of crude oil and other products to the major oil refineries in the American Midwest and the Canadian province of Ontario. The Canadian portion is owned by Enbridge, while the U.S. portion is partly owned by that company through Enbridge Energy Partners, LP, formerly known as Lakehead Pipe Line Partners and Lakehead Pipe Line Company.

Background
The first portion of the pipeline was built over the course of 150 days in 1950 by a 1,500-man labor force. At the same time, four oil tankers were constructed to carry the crude from Superior to oil refineries in Sarnia, Ontario. Oil first entered the pipe on August 25, 1950, and the first tanker, Imperial LeDuc, was launched on November 4. Other tankers that followed were, Imperial Redwater, Imperial Woodbend, and B.A. Peerless.

Because the lakes froze in the winter, preventing tanker traffic, the decision was soon made to expand the pipeline all the way to Sarnia.  In May 1953, contracts were awarded and construction began.  At , it became the world's longest pipeline.  A major upgrade was undertaken in the 1990s to replace old pipe and expand the system.

Mainline system
Today, there are two routes that oil can take between Superior and Sarnia. A northern route passes through the upper and lower peninsulas of Michigan before crossing into Ontario, while the southern route circles south of Lake Michigan through Illinois and Indiana before reaching Michigan.

One major junction point is in Clearbrook, Minnesota where the pipeline connects to the Minnesota Pipeline, which carries crude to the Pine Bend Refinery in Rosemount, Minnesota. The North Dakota Pipeline Company system of pipeline also has a connection in Clearbrook, linking the Mandan Refinery in Mandan, North Dakota. The Murphy Oil refinery in Superior, Wisconsin, is directly linked to the pipeline.

Another point in Lockport, Illinois connects two pipelines to Patoka, Illinois, plus a longer link to Cushing, Oklahoma. A relatively short  link from Stockbridge, Michigan connects to two refineries in the Toledo, Ohio area.

The Mainline system, conventionally divided into the US and Canadian mainlines, consists of 1900 miles of pipeline that run from central Alberta to southern Ontario via the northern US. The system can carry up to 2.5 million barrels of oil per day. Lines 1 through 4 connect Edmonton to Superior, Wisconsin. From there, Line 5 runs through the Upper Peninsula of Michigan and across the straits of Mackinac to cross back into Canada at the St. Clair River. Line 6 runs south through Wisconsin and Illinois to the terminal in Griffith, Indiana, which serves BP Whiting and other Chicago-area clients, and then continues on through northwest Indiana and southern Michigan to rejoin Line 5 at Sarnia, Ontario.

The Mainline system comprises Lines 1, 2, 3, 4, 5, 6, 7, 10, 11, 14, 61, 62, 64, and 67.  Pipelines that connect to the system, but are not part of it, include Line 9 (Montreal to Sarnia), Line 17 (Stockbridge to Toledo), and Line 55 (Flanagan to Cushing).

Expansion
As of 2013 there were expansion plans for the pipeline system which would, if permitted and fully built, provide the capacity to transport an amount of dilbit from the Athabasca oil sands into the United States and the Gulf Coast equal to that of the Keystone Pipeline.

Accidents and incidents

Largest inland oil spill In U.S. history

In 1991, Enbridge's Line 3 pipeline spilled 1.7 million gallons of oil in Grand Rapids, Minnesota and the Prairie River, a tributary of the Mississippi River. It was the largest inland spill of oil in U.S. history. Deliberations over construction of a new Line 3 pipeline have drawn resistance from climate justice organizers and Native communities in Minnesota.

Cohasset, MN oil spill 
On July 4, 2002, 252,000 gallons of crude oil spilled into a marsh near Cohasset, Minnesota due to a rupture of Line 4 running from Edmonton, Alberta, Canada, and Superior, Wisconsin. Emergency responders enacted a controlled burn at 4:45pm the next day to prevent the oil from penetrating into any waterways. The cost of remediating the accident was reported around $5.6 million.

Clearbrook Junction, MN, fire 
On November 28, 2007, a large fire erupted during pipeline repair work at the Clearbrook Junction.  This fire, described by a spokesperson for the Minnesota Department of Public Safety as a "big fire, not an explosion", killed two workers and caused a $4 per barrel spike in oil prices the following day. The  pipeline carries crude from Saskatchewan to the Chicago area.

Kalamazoo River oil spill 

On July 26, 2010, 840,000 gallons of dilbit crude oil leaked from the pipeline in Calhoun County, Michigan, spilling into Talmadge Creek that flows into the Kalamazoo River. Despite alarms at Edmonton headquarters it took eighteen hours and a report from a Michigan utilities employee before the pipeline company acted to halt the flow finally. Enbridge reached a settlement with the U.S. Department of Justice and Environmental Protection Agency for a total of $177 million in response to the spill, along with an additional spill in Romeoville, Illinois later that year. This settlement included $110 million in spill prevention, $62 million in Clean Water Act violations, and $5.4 million in cleanup costs. In addition, the company was fined $3.7 million by the United States Department of Transportation due to 24 violations in pipeline safety regulation. By 2014, the cost of cleanup to the company totaled to $1.21 billion.

Mackinac Straits Tugboat anchor incident
In 2018, a tugboat dropped its anchor on the pipeline near the Straits of Mackinac in Michigan, denting the pipe and causing 600 gallons (2,270 liters) of mineral oil to leak from two electric cables.

See also
 Enbridge
 Enbridge Pipelines
 Enbridge Northern Gateway Pipelines
 List of oil pipelines
 List of oil refineries
 List of pipeline accidents in the United States
 North Dakota Pipeline Company system

Bibliography

References

External links
 Enbridge
 Enbridge Asset Map (current)

Transport in Alberta
Oil pipelines in Indiana
Transport in Manitoba
Pipelines in Michigan
Oil pipelines in Minnesota
Oil pipelines in North Dakota
Transport in Ontario
Oil pipelines in Wisconsin
Oil pipelines in Canada
Crude oil pipelines in the United States
Energy infrastructure in Illinois
Enbridge
Oil spills in Alberta
Environmental issues in Alberta